Karl Douglas Pagel (born March 29, 1955) is a former Major League Baseball first baseman who played for five seasons. He played for the Chicago Cubs from 1978 to 1979 and the Cleveland Indians from 1981 to 1983.

In nine minor league seasons, Pagel hit .294 with 163 home runs and 587 RBIs. Pagel was named MVP of the Texas League in 1977 when he played for the Midland Cubs. Pagel was named MVP of the American Association in 1979 while playing for the Wichita Aeros. Pagel was named to the International League All-Star team in 1982 with the Charleston Charlies. Pagel retired following the 1984 season in which he played for in the Maine Guides.

Pagel lives in the Phoenix, Arizona area, where he has worked as a driver for UPS.

References

Miscellaneous
Karl is the brother of former NFL quarterback Mike Pagel.

External links

1955 births
Living people
Major League Baseball first basemen
Major League Baseball outfielders
Chicago Cubs players
Cleveland Indians players
Glendale Vaqueros baseball players
Baseball players from Wisconsin
Texas Longhorns baseball players
Pompano Beach Cubs players
Wichita Aeros players
Sportspeople from Madison, Wisconsin
American Association (1902–1997) MVP Award winners